Murphy's Law is an American hardcore punk band from New York City, formed in 1982. While vocalist Jimmy Gestapo remains the only founding member of the band, the line-up has consisted of numerous musicians who have performed with a diverse selection of musical acts across multiple genres, such as Skinnerbox, Danzig, The Bouncing Souls, Mucky Pup, Dog Eat Dog, Hanoi Rocks, Agnostic Front, Warzone, Cro-Mags, D Generation, New York Dolls, Joan Jett & the Blackhearts, The Slackers, Thursday, Skavoovie and the Epitones, and Glen Campbell.

Over the course of their career, Murphy's Law have released five albums, the last of which was released in 2001.

History

Murphy's Law and Back with a Bong (1986–1990)
The self-titled debut album features fast-paced, short songs with more mosh sections, but they also managed to blend in some laid-back Californian punk sounds and even blues into the stomping New York hardcore anthems. Some of the songs on this album could also be credited as an influence on the burgeoning thrash metal scene which had taken to incorporating elements of New York hardcore into their sound and general song structure – for instance, Anthrax and S.O.D., whose Speak English or Die album (even being released a year before the actual registration of Murphy's Law eponymous) predated this release. They shared a common interest in the lyrical themes of drinking, smoking, and partying with the likes of Boston hardcore band, Gang Green – another trait which separates them from the sociopolitical leanings of fellow NYHC bands. On later albums they diversified with experiments into ska.

The album spawned a few live favorites which were devised to "get the party going" – "Fun", "Beer", and "Care Bear" being just a small selection – but it also had a track which caused some controversy with "Skinhead Rebel". It was seen by some sectors of the community as a fascist infused song. The album also includes a cover version of Iggy Pop's "I Got a Right".

Back with a Bong was released in 1989 on Profile Records, and subsequently re-released on Another Planet Records in 1994, with the previous self-titled album on the same disc. It came three years after the previous album and the band had undergone somewhat of a transformation with Jimmy Gestapo the only remaining member. Alex Morris had been replaced on guitar by Todd Youth – previously of fellow New York City hardcore bands, Agnostic Front and Warzone, and later of Danzig. Chuck Valle replaced Pete Martinez on bass, and Doug E. Beans took over drumming duties from Petey Hines. In 1989, Murphy's Law opened for the Red Hot Chili Peppers on their Mother's Milk tour.

The Best of Times (1991–1992)
Murphy's Law ushered in the 1990s with a reinvigorated blast of their debauchery-laced brand of comedic punk. Stylistically, Murphy's Law made quite a jump on The Best of Times. The band did dabble in skacore long before it exploded, but was always pretty much a flat-out hardcore unit in the 1980s. The Best of Times finds Jimmy Gestapo and friends combining funk, reggae, ska, and hardcore into their own distinct brew, shedding any dogmatic restrictions applied to the standards of their genre in the 1980s.

Production by Fishbone's John "Norwood" Fisher and Philip "Fish" Fisher lends authenticity and diversity to The Best of Times, as does the added instrumentation by several members of Fishbone. Covers of James Brown and Stevie Wonder provide some insight into Murphy's Law's sometimes controversial and misunderstood affiliation with the skinhead faction, finally putting to rest any allegations that racism or fascism have anything to do with the band's outlook. Although the group manages to shed this stereotype and expand musically on The Best of Times, the subject matter doesn't otherwise stray too far from earlier work. Songs about pot, beer, girls, and cars showcase the glorious immaturity and quest for fun that pretty much define Murphy's Law. When the band does get serious, which is not very often, it's in the interest of unity and friendship.

The title track is basically a fan tribute, thanking a small but loyal group of followers for the support that's enabled Murphy's Law to continue the party. The ska-tinged but heavy "1%" revels in the outcast-minded punk rock ethos, giving nod to those who embrace the good and bad of surfing the fringe of culture and society. Classic Murphy's Law rage surfaces on "Harder Than Who", an attack on the mindless aggression and competition that sometimes rule the hardcore scene.

Good for Now, death of Chuck Valle and two more albums (1993–2009)

Murphy's Law collected a bunch of stomping, fast and anthem-style hardcore punk songs for this. It is first studio album in five years since The Best of Times. The personnel differed from previous efforts, but Jimmy G's vocals still provide the sound's basis. As with prior albums, the lyrics revolve mainly around smoking, drinking, and partying. A blur of melodic hardcore eventually gives way near the end to some saxophone-led ska. Dedication was released by Another Planet on March 19, 1996. The label had already picked up the rights to their previous material from Profile Records and in 1994 had released a split CD with their self-titled and Back with a Bong albums on the same disc.

The album was produced by Daniel Rey who had previously worked with The Ramones, The Misfits, and even Boston hardcore punk band Gang Green – with whom Murphy's Law share a lyrical penchant. He also wrote one of the songs for this album, "Green Bud". It follows 1993's Good for Now EP and the 1991 studio album, The Best of Times.  The album Dedicated, released in 1996, was dedicated to former bass player, Chuck Valle, who was killed in a knife related incident in 1994. His picture appears on the back page of the CD inlay and a picture of a tattoo inscribed with the words "In Memory of Chuck" appears on the jewel case inlay. The band did not record another album until The Party's Over in 2001, but had plenty of singles, compilation, and split EPs with other bands in between. In 2002 Reflex/Wolfpack Records released a European vinyl pressing of The Party's Over.

Listeners find former D Generation guitarist Rick Bacchus, bassist Sal Villaneuva (Demonspeed), and drummer Eric Arce (Skarhead) joining forces with original Murphy's Law frontman Jimmy G and producer Daniel Rey (Ramones, The Misfits, and White Zombie). The result of this 2001 collaboration is 15 tracks of blistering, rowdy, and fast club punk. The song "The Party's Over" refers to the Mayor Rudolph Giuliani's intense "clean up" of the Big Apple. There are few musical departures on this predominately speedy punk album. "Walking Alone" incorporates a bit of a reggae vibe, while a saxophone line accents "Skinhead Girl", a cover of the song originally by Symarip, that takes the tempo down a notch to a swaggering groove (but stays true to punk form).

I Scream Records (2010–present)
On April 12, 2010, Murphy's Law announced in a MySpace blog entry that they were working on a sixth studio album as well as a DVD and vinyl reissues of their back catalog. On May 4, 2011, it was announced that Murphy's Law were signed to I Scream Records, who were scheduled to release the band's first studio album of original material since 2001's The Party's Over, as well as reissues of their back catalog. The reissued albums were released on CD, digital download, and vinyl in 2014 with previously unreleased bonus tracks. However, to date, the new album of original material has yet to be released.

Media
In 2002, the band appeared in Matthew Barney's film Cremaster 3 along with Agnostic Front. In 2004, the song "Vicky Crown" appeared in a music video montage featuring Nick Mondo in the game Backyard Wrestling 2. In 2008, the song "A Day in the Life" was featured, as well as Jimmy G. himself as the DJ of Liberty City Hardcore (L.C.H.C) radio station in the action videogame Grand Theft Auto IV.

Members
Murphy's Law has gone through many line-up changes over its four decade history with Jimmy Gestapo its only constant member.

Current members
 Jimmy Gestapo (James Drescher) – vocals (1982–present)
 Ben Social – guitars
 Amy Wappel – bass
 Seth Nelsen – drums

Past members

Guitars
 Alex "Uncle Al" Morris (1982–1986)
 Todd Youth (Danzig, Chrome Locust, Agnostic Front, Warzone, D Generation, Glen Campbell) (1989–1991, 1996) (died 2018)
 Jack Flanagan (The Mob) (1993)
 Ace Von Johnson (Madcap, The Generators, Duane Peters Gunfight)
 Christopher Kerrigan aka "Chris Redd" (Lockdown, Those Hated Hearts, Necktangle, Revenge of the Dragon)
 Chris Shannon (Demonspeed)
 Dan Nastasi (Dog Eat Dog, Nastasee, Mucky Pup, Kings Never Die)
 Erick "Epick" Hartz (Los Dudes, The Boilermakers, Zen Butcher, The Lobrows)
 Felipe Lithgow
 Jason Stickney (CHUD)
 Jason Burton (Not A Part of It)
 Joe Porfido (Inhuman, Agnostic Front)
 Johnny Waste (Urban Waste, Major Conflict)
 Larry "the Hunter" Nieroda (Subzero, Stigma, Son of Skam, Loved & Hated, Inhuman, Sheer Terror, Kings Never Die)
 Rick Bacchus
 Sean Kilkenny (Dog Eat Dog, Mucky Pup, Harley's War, Stigma)
 Tim Miller (Blanks 77Broken Heroes)
 Rod Martino (Ruder Than You)
 A.J. Novello (1997)
 Kane Kelly (die Strömms)

Bass
 Adam Mucci (1982)
 Pete Martinez (1986)
 Chuck Valle (Ludichrist, Dripping Goss) (1989–1993)
 Dean Rispler (1996)
 Aaron "White Owl" Collins (Skarhead, White Trash, Hash)
 Anthony Di Masi (The Unopposed)
 Ben "Tucks" Orenstein (U.N. Posse)
 Brian Ellingham aka Pico Da' Bass (F.O. the Smack Magnet)
 Christian Hoffmeister
 Dug Donohoe
 Eddie Cohen
 Felipe Lithgow
 "Genghis" Jon Carrier
 Ghoul Man
 J.R.
 Phil Caivano (Shrapnel, Blitzspeer, Monster Magnet)
 Ron Delux (The Turnbucklers, Unlucky 3, Cinema Nine)
 Russel Iglay (Underdog)
 Sal Villanueva
 Sami Yaffa (Hanoi Rocks, New York Dolls, Joan Jett & the Blackhearts)
 Tommy Kennedy
 Tommy Sick (DFA, Zyris, SIB)

Drums
 Harley Flanagan (Cro-Mags, The Stimulators) (1982)
 Petey Hines (Cro-Mags, Handsome) (1986)
 Doug Beans (The Functional Idiots, Mearth, The Montalbans, Hellride 102, Aggravated Assault, Defiance) (1989–1991)
 Michael McDermott (Skinnerbox, The Bouncing Souls, Joan Jett And The Blackhearts) (1993)
 Eric "Goat" Arce (Crown of Thornz, Skarhead, Merauder, The Misfits) (1996)
 Chris Ara (Zombie Vandals, The Krays)
 Dan Lettieri
 Donny Didjits (Time Bomb 77, Anti Heros, A.P.A, Liberty)
 Frank Lema (Half-Life, Freakmode)
 Jay Colangelo (American Standard)
 John “Solar Skin” Sullivan
 Nick Angeleri
 Quincy Kirk (Graves, Broken Heroes, Headwound)
 Steve Barna (Fake Your Death)
 Todd Irwin
 Tucker Rule (Thursday)
 Vincent Alva rest in peace. 
 Pokey (1997)

Horns
 Angelo Moore – saxophone (1989–1991)
 Christopher Dowd – trombone (1989)
 Walter Kibby III – trumpet (1989)
 Scott Mayo – saxophone (1991)
 Reggie Young – trombone (1991)
 Fernando Pullam – trumpet (1991)
 Jeff "Django" Baker (Skinnerbox, Stubborn All-Stars) – trombone (1993)
 Danny Dulin (Skinnerbox, Stubborn All-Stars) – trumpet (1993)
 Ben Jaffe (Skavoovie and the Epitones, The Diamond Mines, Eli "Paperboy" Reed and the True Loves) – saxophone
 D-Robb (D-Robb and The Shots) – trombone
 Jeremy "Mush One" Mushlin (The Slackers) – trumpet, vocals
 Johnny Banks – trumpet
 John Mulkerin – trumpet
 Joseph Bowie – trombone
 Raven (Seaton "Chuck" Hancock III) – saxophone

Timeline

Discography

Albums
 Bong Blast (1983) Spliff Records
 Murphy's Law (1986) Profile Records
 Back with a Bong (1989) Profile Records
 The Best of Times (1991) Relativity Records
 Dedicated (1996) Another Planet
 The Party's Over (2001) Artemis Records
 Beer, Smoke, and Live (2002) P.O.P. Records
 The Best (2005) NYHC Tattoos Records
 Covered (2005) NYHC Tattoos Records

Re-Issued albums
 Murphy's Law / Back with a Bong (1994) Another Planet – split CD
 The Best of Times / Good for Now (2000) Artemis Records – split CD

EPs
 Good for Now EP (1994) We Bite Records

Music videos
 "Panty Raid" (1989)
 "What Will the Neighbors Think?" (1996)
 "Vicky Crown" (2001)

Singles
 "Monster Mash" (1991) Relativity Records – CD single
 "My Woman from Tokyo" (1995) – Japan only 7" split single
 "What Will the Neighbors Think?" (1996) Another Planet – 7" single
 "Genkika" (1996) – Japan only 7" split single
 "Kansai Woman" (1996) – Japan only 7" single
 "Quality of Life" (1998) NG Records – 7" split single

Compilation albums
 How to Start a Fight (1996) Side One Dummy Records
 Show & Tell - A Stormy Remembrance of TV Themes (1997) Which? Records
 Creepy Crawl Live (1997) Another Planet
 Music to Kill For (1998) Triple Crown Records
 City Rockers: A Tribute to the Clash (1999) Side One Dummy Records
 Never Mind The Sex Pistols: Here's The Tribute (2000) Radical Crown Records
 Under the Influence - A Tribute to the Clash, the Cure, and the Smiths (2001) Triple Crown Records
 The World Wide Tribute to the Real Oi Volume 2 (2002) I Scream Records
 Jager Music Volume 2 (2002) jagermusic.com Records
 Warped Tour Compilation (2002) Side One Dummy Records

References

External links

 at Crawlspace Booking

Musical groups established in 1982
Hardcore punk groups from New York (state)
Musical groups from New York City
Crossover thrash groups
1982 establishments in New York City
Relativity Records artists